Premier Executive Transport Services was an airline listed as Foreign Corporation in the Commonwealth of Massachusetts.  It is alleged to be a front company for the Central Intelligence Agency (CIA). According to investigative journalists the company does not have any offices or premises, and searches of public records for identifying information about the company's officers have yielded only post office boxes in Virginia, Maryland and Washington, D.C. and also known as P LLC in Wyoming.

Premier Executive Transport Services has apparently owned two planes, both with permits to land at U.S. military bases: a Gulfstream V with the tail number N44982 (formerly N379P and N8068V), and a Boeing 737 with the tail number N313P (now N720MM and owned by MGM Mirage.) These planes are reported to have been involved in the CIA's extraordinary rendition program, in which suspected terrorists are transported to black sites to be interrogated and, allegedly, tortured.

See also
Black site
Aero Contractors
Rendition aircraft
 List of defunct airlines of the United States

References

External links
 State of Massachusetts Records of Premier Executive Transport Services

Central Intelligence Agency front organizations
Defunct airlines of the United States
Companies based in Massachusetts
Extraordinary rendition program
Central Intelligence Agency operations
Conspiracy theories in the United States